Arturo Merino Núñez (born 28 July 1960)is a retired Chilean officer, who held the post commander-in-chief of the Chilean Air Force. He is the son of commodore Arturo Merino Benítez, founder of the Chilean Air Force (1930) and LAN-Chile (1929).

References

1960 births
Living people
Chilean Air Force generals
People from Santiago